A wagon is a heavy four-wheeled vehicle pulled by draught animals.

Wagon may also refer to:

Transport
 Automobile, including:
 Crossover (automobile)
 Minivan
 Sport utility vehicle
 Station wagon
 Van
 Goods wagon or freight car, a railroad car used for transporting cargo
 Scenery wagon, a mobile platform upon which theatrical scenery is built
 Toy wagon
 Wagon Automotive, a British car parts company

Music
 Wagons (band), an Australian alt-country band
 Wagon (instrument) or yamatogoto, a Japanese musical instrument
 "The Wagon", a 1990 song by Dinosaur Jr.

People with the surname
 Daniel Wagon (born 1976), Australian rugby league player and coach
 Stan Wagon, Canadian-American mathematician

Other uses
 Ursa Major or "the Wagon", a constellation

See also
 
 
 West Anglia Great Northern, a former British railway company
 WAGN (AM), a USA radio station